Death and the Penguin are an English four-piece Alternative band from London, England.

The band consists of Toby Smith (vocals/guitar), Chris Olsen (guitar/keyboard/vocals), Andy Acred (bass/keyboard/vocals) and Phil Gadsden (drums). The band's musical style has been described as a combination of hardcore, indie and math rock, and has been compared to established acts such as The Mars Volta, Radiohead and Minus The Bear.

The band released their debut album "Anomie" on 27 July 2018, featuring the singles Kill Saatchi ("a perfect  equilibrium  between  disjointed  key  signatures  and  catchy  instrumentals" - The Line of Best Fit) and Colour In Me ("a  devastating  bout  of  avant  rock  that  breaks  down  barriers  into  tiny  little  pieces" - Clash (magazine)).

Discography 

The band's debut EP 'Accidents Happen' was released on 9 June 2014 on Best Before Records
and featured singles 'Strange Times' (aired on BBC Introducing, XFM and Amazing Radio and included in a compilation by the Big Scary Monsters Recording Company) and 'Snuffed Out'  (featured on the Vevo HQ Alternative/ Indie Mix 2014).

The second EP 'Eine Kleine Granatenmusik' was self-released in November 2016 and included single "No Blood, No Sport", featured by Kerrang!.

The debut album 'Anomie' followed on 27 July 2018 to critical acclaim from the likes of Metal Injection ("Anomie is a triumphant record from start to finish" 8/10), Alt Dialogue ("This is an album that will thrill and relax, it’ll take you to highs and lows, but one thing is for sure – you’ll fall in love with Death & The Penguin" - 9/10) and Soundscape Magazine ("A bold release that breaks the mould" - 9/10).

Additional information 
The band have toured extensively around the UK highlighted by performances at Wrong Festival and ArcTanGent Festival 2018.

References

Musical groups from London
Musical groups established in 2013
Math rock groups
English indie rock groups
Best Before Records artists
2013 establishments in England